Eddie Conde Gil (born February 7, 1944 in Masbate) is a Filipino singer and comedian who attempted to run for President of the Philippines during the 2004 presidential elections. However, he was disqualified from running by the Commission on Elections, citing his inability to begin a national campaign and marking him as a 'nuisance candidate.' Gil appealed his disqualification to the Philippine Supreme Court, where it was upheld. A self-proclaimed billionaire, he promised fellow Filipinos to pay off the national debt with his own finances.  But in an embarrassing occurrence in one of his 'campaign sorties' in Mindanao, particularly Cagayan de Oro, Gil wasn't even able to afford the hotel accommodations. Many ridiculed his attempt for the Presidency, linking his involvement in politics merely to promote his upcoming album.

In June 2010, Gil was arrested with 3 others in Mauritius on fraud charges. Gil presented a forged 10 Billion Euro bank guarantee to Investec Bank Mauritius. The false bank guarantee was to be used to solicit a loan. However, in August 2011, the Supreme Court of Mauritius allowed an appeal by Gil and two co-appellants, quashing the original conviction.

References

1944 births
Living people
20th-century Filipino male singers
Candidates in the 2004 Philippine presidential election
University of the Philippines people
People from Masbate